The Coronado National Forest is a United States National Forest that includes an area of about 1.78 million acres (7,200 km2) spread throughout mountain ranges in southeastern Arizona and southwestern New Mexico.

It is located in parts of Cochise, Graham, Santa Cruz, Pima, and Pinal Counties in Arizona, and Hidalgo County in New Mexico.

History
During a party in 2017, the Sawmill Fire broke out and went out control. The fire went on for many days. Approximately  were burnt. The person behind the fire was an off duty US Border Patrol agent. He was fined and given probation.

The Arizona Department of Emergency and Military Affairs constructed a  length of wall in 2022 on federal and tribal lands near Yuma, without federal permission. The National Forest Supervisor told the state to refrain from placing more shipping containers along the Arizona border with Mexico without obtaining proper authorization. Governor Doug Ducey filed a lawsuit in October against federal agencies that have sought to force the removal of the initial 130 containers used as a wall on the border. Governor-elect Katie Hobbs has stated intention to remove the containers after taking office. The State has agreed to remove the containers starting January 2023.

Administration
The national forest is divided into five ranger districts, which are not contiguous; each consists of multiple sky island mountain ranges.

The Santa Catalina Ranger District near the city of Tucson comprises the Santa Catalina and Rincon Mountains. Included in this area are the highest peak of the Santa Catalinas, Mount Lemmon, the rugged Pusch Ridge Wilderness Area, and the popular Sabino Canyon. Much of this district was part of Santa Catalina National Forest before its inclusion in Coronado.

The Safford Ranger District comprises the mountain ranges surrounding the city of Safford, Arizona. These five ranges are the Pinaleño, Galiuro, Santa Teresa, Winchester, and Greasewood Mountains. Included in this area is the highest peak of the Pinaleños, Mount Graham. Mount Graham National Forest was a formerly separate national forest, combined into Crook National Forest on July 1, 1908. In 1953, part of Crook was absorbed into Coronado.

The Nogales Ranger District comprises four mountain ranges north and west of Nogales, Arizona. These ranges are the Santa Rita, Tumacacori, Pajarito, and San Luis Mountains. Included in this area are Mount Hopkins, Mount Wrightson, and Madera Canyon, all located in the Santa Ritas. In the early 20th century, this area included two national forests which were absorbed into Coronado: Santa Rita National Forest and Tumacacori National Forest.

The Douglas Ranger District comprises three mountain ranges north and east of Douglas, Arizona. These ranges are the Chiricahua, Dragoon, and Peloncillo Mountains. A portion of the ranger district in the Peloncillos extends into New Mexico. The district comprises three formerly separate national forests: Chiricahua National Forest, Dragoon National Forest, and Peloncillo National Forest, all combined into Coronado.

The Sierra Vista Ranger District comprises three mountain ranges west of Sierra Vista, Arizona. These ranges are the Huachuca, Patagonia, and Whetstone Mountains. Included in this area is the highest peak in the Huachucas, Miller Peak, and the region of the Huachucas known as Canelo Hills. The district includes the formerly separate Huachuca National Forest

Wilderness

The Coronado National Forest contains eight designated wilderness areas, with at least one in each ranger district.  Congress defines "wilderness" as an area "untrammeled by man."  Common activities in the Coronado National Forest wilderness areas include hiking, horseback riding, camping, hunting, and fishing.  The use of mechanized or motorized equipment, including bicycles, generators, and chain saws, is prohibited.
 Chiricahua Wilderness (Douglas District)
 Galiuro Wilderness (Safford District)
 Miller Peak Wilderness (Sierra Vista District)
 Mount Wrightson Wilderness (Nogales District)
 Pajarita Wilderness (Nogales District)
 Pusch Ridge Wilderness (Santa Catalina District)
 Rincon Wilderness (Santa Catalina District)
 Santa Teresa Wilderness (Safford District)

Campgrounds
The public campgrounds located within the Coronado National Forest, most of which require a daily/nightly fee (see Coronado National Forest official website for accurate and current details), are as follows:

See also
 Aspen Fire
 Cumero Fire

References

External links
 Coronado National Forest Web Site
 Forest History Society
 Hikes in the Coronado National Forest at HikeArizona.COM
 Listing of the National Forests of the United States and Their Dates (from Forest History Society website) Text from Davis, Richard C., ed. Encyclopedia of American Forest and Conservation History. New York: Macmillan Publishing Company for the Forest History Society, 1983. Vol. II, pp. 743–788.

 
National Forests of Arizona
Protected areas of Pinal County, Arizona
Protected areas of Cochise County, Arizona
Protected areas of Graham County, Arizona
Protected areas of Santa Cruz County, Arizona
Protected areas of Pima County, Arizona
Protected areas of Hidalgo County, New Mexico
National Forests of New Mexico
Protected areas established in 1902
1902 establishments in Arizona Territory